Air Åland AB was the provincial airline of Åland, with its head office on the grounds of Mariehamn Airport in  Mariehamn, Åland, Finland. It operated scheduled services from Åland to Helsinki and Stockholm. Its main base was Mariehamn Airport. 
Starting from 1 July 2012, its operations were handed over to the Sweden-based company NextJet.

History 
The airline was founded on 14 January 2005 as Flyg & Far Åland and started operation on 29 October 2005, with a broad base of owners within the trade and business of the Åland islands. The airline never had an own AOC (Air Operator Certificate), the flight operations were operated through the years by different air operators. The goal of the owners was to maintain air traffic with good quality for a low price to mainland Finland and Sweden. Operations started on 29 October 2005.
Starting from 1 July 2012, its operations were handed over to the Sweden-based company NextJet.

Destinations (before 2012) 
In January 2011, Air Åland served the following destinations:
 
 Helsinki (Helsinki-Vantaa Airport)
 
 Stockholm (Stockholm-Arlanda Airport)
 
 Mariehamn (Mariehamn Airport) hub

Fleet (before 2012) 
In 2010, the Air Åland fleet consisted of 2 Saab 340A operated by Nextjet.

References

External links 
 Air Åland Fleet

Defunct airlines of Finland
Airlines established in 2005
Airlines disestablished in 2012
Aviation in Åland
Finnish companies established in 2005
2005 establishments in Finland
2012 disestablishments in Finland